Rhynchopyga garleppi is a species of moth in the subfamily Arctiinae. It is found in Bolivia.

References

Moths described in 1926
Euchromiina